Renaud Mary (31 July 1918 – 5 May 1977) was a French stage and film actor.

Filmography

References

Bibliography
Thomas C. Renzi. Jules Verne on Film: A Filmography of the Cinematic Adaptations of His Works, 1902 Through 1997. McFarland, 1998.

External links

1918 births
1977 deaths
French male film actors
French male stage actors
Male actors from Bordeaux